Ervin B. "Buddy" Elrod (October 28, 1918 – June 13, 1998) was an American football player.  He attended the Mississippi State University and played college football for the Mississippi State Bulldogs football team.  He played at the end position for the Bulldogs and was selected by the Associated Press, Central Press Association, New York Sun and Liberty magazine as a first-team player on the 1940 College Football All-America Team. He played for the Philadelphia Eagles in 1941 and entered the military in 1942. He was inducted into the Mississippi State Sports Hall of Fame in 1971 and the Mississippi Sports Hall of Fame in 1975.

References 

1918 births
1998 deaths
American football ends
Mississippi State Bulldogs football players
Philadelphia Eagles players
Players of American football from Texas
People from Sherman, Texas